Soviet Championship (disambiguation), various meanings
 Soviet Hockey League, top league of Soviet hockey
 Soviet Top League, football competition
 USSR Chess Championship, chess competition